Phi Phong, also called Phi Pong (Thai: ผีโพง, ผีโป่ง), is a Thai ghost of Northern folk beliefs. It has another name in Isan language (Northeast dialect) as Phi Phao (ผีเป้า).

Believed that those who are Phi Phong caused by the black magic power of a plant that is planted called "Wan Phi Phong" (ว่านผีโพง; lit: "ghost herb")" which has a hot flavour and can glow at night like luminous woodlouse.

In the daytime Phi Phong is shaped as a normal person, but at night it becomes a ghost. The distinctive feature of Phi Phong is that there is a glow from the nostril like a torch, it will search for food at night, such as frogs, fish, dung, carcasses or placenta like Krasue, Krahang or Pop.

Typically, Phi Phong don't harm humans unless threatened, whereby Phi Phong will throw banana stalks cut from the widow's water shoulder pole over the roof of the victim's house. Which will cause the family of the house to suffer many adversities.

Phi Phong can die if someone says that the person who is a Phi Phong, as a ghost.

Phi Phong can be transmitted to another person, from being spit by Phi Phong or eat saliva of Phi Phong.

At Phlapphla Subdistrict, Chok Chai District, Nakhon Ratchasima Province. There's a village named "Ban Nong Phi Lok" (บ้านหนองผีหลอก; " Spooky Marsh Village"). It is about 5 km away from the district center. Most of the condition is cassava and paddy fields. This's due to the rumors that have been around for hundreds of years. In the past there were about 100 rais (about 1/3 acres) of wetland adjacent to the dirt road. In the evening, Phi Phong often search for food, therefore no one dares to pass by at night. Until now, this village hasn't been officially promoted as a village.

See also
Thai ghosts

References

Thai ghosts